James Hay, 15th Earl of Erroll (20 April 1726 – 3 July 1778) styled Lord Boyd from 1728 to 1746, was a Scottish nobleman and the son of William Boyd, 4th Earl of Kilmarnock.

Early life
He was born James Boyd at Falkirk on 20 April 1726. James was the eldest son of William Boyd, 4th Earl of Kilmarnock and Lady Anne Livingston, and from 1728 to 1746, he was known by the courtesy title of Lord Boyd while his father was Earl of Kilmarnock.

His mother was only daughter of James Livingston, 5th Earl of Linlithgow, a Jacobite attainted for his role in the 1715 Rising, and Lady Margaret Hay (the second daughter of John Hay, 12th Earl of Erroll).

Career
During the 1745 Jacobite Rebellion his father sided with the Young Pretender, despite both James and his brother William then holding commissions under George II; James in the army, William in the navy. Remaining loyal to the Hanoverians, James then served at the Battle of Culloden, fighting on the opposite side to his father. During the rout following the Jacobite defeat, the Earl was captured and taken into the government camp, dishevelled and bareheaded, where he was reportedly recognised by James, who placed his own hat upon his father's head. This was the last time they were to meet, as the Earl was then transported to London where he was tried for treason and executed four months later; forfeiting all his lands and titles and thus depriving James of his inheritance.

In 1751, however, although the Earldom was abolished, James was permitted to inherit the Kilmarnock estates. These included Dean Castle, the former family seat which had been gutted by a fire in 1735. Trying to recoup some of his father's debts (which he had also inherited), James sold the ruined castle to the 13th Earl of Glencairn. From 1751 to 1752, he served as Grand Master of the Grand Lodge of Scotland.

Later life
On 19 August 1758, he succeeded his maternal great-aunt, Mary Hay, 14th Countess of Erroll as the 15th Earl of Erroll, simultaneously changing his surname from Boyd to Hay, as he and his descendants were henceforth known. Along with the title Earl of Erroll, he also held the ceremonial hereditary office of Lord High Constable of Scotland.

Between 1770 and 1774, he served as a Tory Representative Peer in the House of Lords, and from 1770 to 1778, he was Lord of Police for Scotland.

Personal life
On 15 September 1749, he married Rebecca Lockhart, the daughter of Alexander Lockhart, Lord Covington. Before her death in 1761, they were the parents of one daughter:

 Lady Mary Hay (b. 1754), who married Gen. John Scott of Balcomie in 1770, divorced in 1771.

In 1762, he married Isabella Carr (1747–1808), daughter of Sir William Carr of Etal, Northumberland. Together, they were the parents of twelve children, including:

 Lady Charlotte Hay (1763–1800), who married Rev. William Holwell, Vicar of Menheniot, in 1797. 
 Lady Isabella Anne Hay (1765–1793) 
 Lady Augusta Hay (1766–1822), who married George Boyle, 4th Earl of Glasgow. 
 George Hay, 16th Earl of Erroll (1767–1798), who married Elizabeth Jemima Blake, the sister of Joseph Blake, 1st Baron Wallscourt. 
 Lady Harriet Jane Hay (1768–1812) 
 Lady Margaret Hay (1769–1832), who married Charles Cameron in 1789. 
 Lady Maria Elizabeth Hay (1771–1804), who married Rev. George Moore, Rector of Wrotham, eldest son of Most. Rev. John Moore, Archbishop of Canterbury, in 1795. 
 William Hay, 17th Earl of Erroll (1772–1819), who married three times and had eleven children.
 Lady Frances Hay (1773–1806) 
 Lady Flaminia Hay (1774–1821), who married Capt. George James in 1809. 
 Lady Jemima Hay (1776–1822) 
 Hon. James Hay (d. 1797)

Lord Erroll died on 3 July 1778 at Callendar House, aged fifty-two, and was succeeded by his eldest son, George. His widow died 3 November 1808.

Descendants
Lord Erroll's grandson, William Hay, 18th Earl of Erroll, was created Baron Kilmarnock in the peerage of the United Kingdom in 1831.

Ancestry

External links

Footnotes

References

15
Rectors of the University of Glasgow
1726 births
1778 deaths
Scottish representative peers